Liberal government may refer to:

Australia
In Australian politics, a Liberal government  may refer to the following governments administered by the Liberal Party of Australia:

 Menzies Government (1949–66), several Australian ministries under Sir Robert Menzies
Fourth Menzies Ministry, the Australian government under Robert Menzies (1949–1951)
Fifth Menzies Ministry, the Australian government under Robert Menzies (1951–1954)
Sixth Menzies Ministry, the Australian government under Robert Menzies (1954–1956)
Seventh Menzies Ministry, the Australian government under Robert Menzies (1956–1958)
Eighth Menzies Ministry, the Australian government under Robert Menzies (1958–1961)
Ninth Menzies Ministry, the Australian government under Sir Robert Menzies (1961–1963)
Tenth Menzies Ministry, the Australian government under Sir Robert Menzies (1963–1966)
 Holt Government, two Australian ministries under Harold Holt
First Holt Ministry, the Australian government under Harold Holt (1966)
Second Holt Ministry, the Australian government under Harold Holt (1966–1967)
 Gorton Government, two Australian ministries under John Gorton
First Gorton Ministry, the Australian government under John Gorton (1968–1969)
Second Gorton Ministry, the Australian government under John Gorton (1969–1971)
 McMahon Government, one Australian ministry under William McMahon
McMahon Ministry, the Australian government under William McMahon (1971–1972)
 Fraser Government, five Australian ministries under Malcolm Fraser
First Fraser Ministry, the Australian government under Malcolm Fraser (1975)
Second Fraser Ministry, the Australian government under Malcolm Fraser (1975–1977)
Third Fraser Ministry, the Australian government under Malcolm Fraser (1977–1980)
Fourth Fraser Ministry, the Australian government under Malcolm Fraser (1980–1983)
 Howard Government, four Australian ministries under John Howard
First Howard Ministry, the Australian government under John Howard (1996–1998)
Second Howard Ministry, the Australian government under John Howard (1998–2001)
Third Howard Ministry, the Australian government under John Howard (2001–2004)
Fourth Howard Ministry, the Australian government under John Howard (2004–2007)
 Abbott Government, one Australian ministry under Tony Abbott
Abbott Ministry, the Australian government under Tony Abbott (2013–2015)
 Turnbull Government, two Australian ministries under Malcolm Turnbull
First Turnbull Ministry, the Australian government under Malcolm Turnbull (2015–2018)
Second Turnbull Ministry, the Australian government under Malcolm Turnbull (2015–2018)
 Morrison Government, two Australian ministries under Scott Morrison
First Morrison Ministry, the Australian government under Scott Morrison (2018–present)
Second Morrison Ministry, the Australian government under Scott Morrison (2018–present)

Canada

In Canadian politics, a Liberal government  may refer to the following governments administered by the Liberal Party of Canada:

 2nd Canadian Ministry, the Canadian government under Alexander Mackenzie (1873–1878)
 8th Canadian Ministry, the Canadian government under Sir Wilfrid Laurier (1896–1911)
 12th Canadian Ministry, the Canadian government under William Lyon Mackenzie King (1921–1926)
 14th Canadian Ministry, the Canadian government under William Lyon Mackenzie King (1926–1930)
 16th Canadian Ministry, the Canadian government under William Lyon Mackenzie King (1935–1948)
 17th Canadian Ministry, the Canadian government under Louis St. Laurent (1948–1957)
 19th Canadian Ministry, the Canadian government under Lester B. Pearson (1963–1968)
 20th Canadian Ministry, the Canadian government under Pierre Trudeau (1968–1979)
 22nd Canadian Ministry, the Canadian government under Pierre Trudeau (1980–1984)
 23rd Canadian Ministry, the Canadian government under John Turner (1984)
 26th Canadian Ministry, the Canadian government under Jean Chrétien (1993–2003)
 27th Canadian Ministry, the Canadian government under Paul Martin (2003–2006)
 29th Canadian Ministry, the Canadian government under Justin Trudeau (2015–present)

New Zealand

United Kingdom
In British politics, a Liberal government  may refer to the following governments administered by the Liberal Party:

 Liberal government, 1859–1866, the British government under Lord Palmerston and Lord Russell respectively
 First Gladstone ministry, the British government under William Ewart Gladstone (1868–1874)
 Second Gladstone ministry, the British government under William Ewart Gladstone (1880–1885)
 Third Gladstone ministry, the British government under William Ewart Gladstone (1886)
 Liberal government, 1892–1895, the British government under William Ewart Gladstone and Lord Rosebery respectively
 Liberal government, 1905–1915, the British government under Sir Henry Campbell-Bannerman and H. H. Asquith respectively

See also

 
 Liberal autocracy
 Liberal democracy
 Liberal Party
 Liberal Party leadership election
 List of Australian ministries
 List of British governments
 List of Canadian ministries
 List of New Zealand ministries
 United Kingdom coalition government